Kelly Hager Thiebaud (born on August 28, 1982) is an American actress and model best known for her portrayal of Dr. Britt Westbourne on ABC daytime soap opera, General Hospital, for which she won the Daytime Emmy Award for Outstanding Supporting Actress in a Drama Series in 2022.

Early life and career
Thiebaud was born in El Campo, Texas and made her screen debut in 2002, in the independent film Journey of Redemption. Apart from her acting work, she also modeled and appeared in four music videos for French disc jockey David Guetta in 2000s. On television, she guest-starred in Chuck, Castle, Criminal Minds, and had the recurring role on the CBS Family series The Secret Life of the American Teenager from 2010 to 2011 and NBC soap opera Days of Our Lives in 2011. In 2011, Thiebaud appeared in the horror film Hostel: Part III. In 2013, She appeared in the Christian drama film Grace Unplugged, playing according to Variety a "superstar pop tart" who uses her body as her path to success.

In 2012, Thiebaud was cast as Dr. Britt Westbourne in the ABC daytime soap opera, General Hospital. In February 2013, Soap Opera Digest confirmed that the actress had been upgraded to a contract status. On November 10, 2014, it was announced that Thiebaud had been placed on recurring status following the conclusion of her two-year contract, in order to pursue other acting opportunities. She reprised the role on several occasions, between 2015 and 2018, for limited-run guest appearances. In March 2020, Thiebaud returned for another guest stint; by September of the same year, she returned to the role once more. In August 2022, it was announced that she will leave the role again. Thiebaud's performance has been met with critical acclaim, winning the Daytime Emmy Award for Outstanding Supporting Actress in a Drama Series in 2022.

Thiebaud played the leading roles in the Lifetime television films The Surrogate (2018) and A Mother on the Edge (2019). In 2020, Thiebaud was cast in the ABC drama series Station 19 playing the recurring role as Eva Vasquez. She returned to series in 2022.

Personal life
Thiebaud became engaged to her former General Hospital co-star Bryan Craig in June 2015. They had been together since 2013. As of 2016, they have broken up.

Filmography

Awards and nominations

References

External links

 
 
 
 

1982 births
Living people
American female models
American film actresses
American television actresses
American soap opera actresses
Daytime Emmy Award winners
Daytime Emmy Award for Outstanding Supporting Actress in a Drama Series winners
Actresses from Texas
People from El Campo, Texas
People from Wharton County, Texas
21st-century American women